Massumi is a surname. Notable people with the surname include:

 Brian Massumi (born 1956), Canadian philosopher and social theorist
 Rashid Massumi (1926–2015), Iranian-American cardiologist